Days of Wine and Roses is a 1962 American drama film directed by Blake Edwards with a screenplay by JP Miller adapted from his own 1958 Playhouse 90 teleplay  of the same name. The film was produced by Martin Manulis, with music by Henry Mancini, and features Jack Lemmon, Lee Remick, Charles Bickford and Jack Klugman. The film depicts the downward spiral of two average Americans who succumb to alcoholism and attempt to deal with their problems.

An Academy Award went to the film's theme music, composed by Mancini with lyrics by Johnny Mercer. The film received four other Oscar nominations, including Best Actor and Best Actress. In 2018, Days of Wine and Roses was selected for preservation in the United States National Film Registry as being "culturally, historically, or aesthetically significant."

Plot
San Francisco public relations executive Joe Clay (Jack Lemmon) meets secretary Kirsten Arnesen (Lee Remick). Considering her to be brash and disrespectful at first, he eventually begins dating her. Kirsten is a teetotaler until Joe introduces her to social drinking. She is reluctant at first, but after her first few Brandy Alexanders, she admits that having a drink makes her “feel good." Despite the misgivings of Kirsten's father (Charles Bickford), who runs a San Mateo landscaping business, they marry and have a daughter, Debbie.

Joe and Kirsten slowly go from the "two-martini lunch" to full-blown alcoholism. Joe is demoted due to poor performance, and is sent out of town to work on a minor account. Kirsten is alone all day, and finds drinking the best way to pass the time. While drunk one afternoon, she causes a fire in their apartment that almost kills her and Debbie. Eventually, Joe is fired, and he spends the next several years going from job to job.

One day, Joe sees his reflection in a bar window, and realizes in horror that he hardly knows his own face. He tells Kirsten that they must stop drinking, and she reluctantly agrees. Seeking escape from their addiction, Joe and Kirsten work together in Arnesen's business and stay sober for two months.  But the urge is too strong, and after a late-night drinking binge, Joe destroys his father-in-law's greenhouse while looking for a stashed liquor bottle.

Joe is committed to a sanitarium, where he suffers from delirium tremens while confined in a straitjacket. After his release, Joe finally gets sober for a while with the help of Alcoholics Anonymous, a dedicated sponsor named Jim Hungerford (Jack Klugman), and regular AA meetings. He explains to Joe how alcoholics often demonstrate obsessive behavior, pointing out that Kirsten's previous passion for chocolate may have been the first sign of an addictive personality. Jim advises Joe that most drinkers hate to drink alone or in the company of sober people.

Meanwhile, Kirsten's drinking persists, and she disappears for several days without contacting Joe. She is eventually located at a nearby motel, drunk, but when Joe tries to help her, he ends up drinking again. When their supply runs out, Joe happens upon a liquor store that has closed for the night. He breaks in and steals a bottle, resulting in another trip to the sanitarium, where he is stripped down and tied to a treatment table. Hungerford appears at his side and warns him that he must keep sober no matter what, even if that means staying away from Kirsten.

Joe finally gets sober, becomes a responsible father to Debbie, and holds down a steady job. He tries to make amends to his father-in-law by offering him payment for past debts and wrongs, but Arnesen accuses him of being indirectly responsible for Kirsten's alcoholism. After calming down, Arnesen says that Kirsten has been disappearing for long stretches of time and is picking up strangers in bars.

One night, after Debbie is asleep, Kirsten, shakily sober for two days, comes to Joe's apartment to attempt a reconciliation. Joe replies that she is welcome back anytime, but only if she stops drinking. Kirsten refuses to admit she is an alcoholic and acknowledges why she can't stop: "The world looks so dirty to me when I'm not drinking.” She tries to persuade Joe to forget the past and reunite with her.  He tells her he won't abandon sobriety for anything, not even her. If she wants to grab on, grab on, but there is no room for booze. Kirsten sadly advises Joe to give up on her. “Not yet,” he says.

She leaves. Joe fights the urge to go after her, calling her name, and watches through the window as she walks out into the night, turning away from a bar. Debbie wakes. He tells her she was dreaming and puts her back to bed, explaining:  “Mommy is sick…” “Is she going to get well?” “I did, didn't I?” Debbie nods.

The last scene is a reverse shot of Joe staring out at the empty street, the bar's flashing neon sign reflected in the window.

Cast
 Jack Lemmon as Joe Clay
 Lee Remick as Kirsten Arnesen-Clay
 Charles Bickford as Ellis Arnesen
 Jack Klugman as Jim Hungerford
 Alan Hewitt as Rad Leland
 Tom Palmer as Ballefoy
 Debbie Megowan as Debbie Clay
 Maxine Stuart as Dottie
 Jack Albertson as Trayner
 Ken Lynch as Liquor Store Proprietor
 Katherine Squire as Mrs. Nolan

Production

Background
JP Miller found his title in the 1896 poem "Vitae Summa Brevis Spem Nos Vetat Incohare Longam" by the English writer Ernest Dowson (1867–1900): It also inspired the title song devised by Henry Mancini and Johnny Mercer.
They are not long, the weeping and the laughter,
Love and desire and hate;
I think they have no portion in us after
We pass the gate.

They are not long, the days of wine and roses:
Out of a misty dream
Our path emerges for a while, then closes
Within a dream.

Johnny Mercer had also written the lyrics for the theme from Laura, a 1944 film in which Dowson's poem is quoted in its entirety.

Miller's teleplay for Playhouse 90, also titled Days of Wine and Roses, had received favorable critical attention and was nominated for an Emmy Award in the category Best Writing of a Single Dramatic Program - One Hour or Longer. Manulis, a Playhouse 90 producer, decided the material was ideal for a movie. Some critics observed that the movie lacked the impact of the original television production, which starred Cliff Robertson as Joe and Piper Laurie as Kirsten. In an article written for DVD Journal, critic D.K. Holm noted numerous changes that altered the original considerably when the material was filmed. He cites as an example the hiring of Jack Lemmon. With his participation "little remained of the founding teleplay, except for actor Charles Bickford reprising his role."

Filming
The film's locations included San Francisco, Albany, California, and the Golden Gate Fields race track. The Oscar-winning title song had music by Henry Mancini and lyrics by Johnny Mercer. Single records by Andy Williams and the Henry Mancini chorus made the Billboard Top 40.

Director Blake Edwards became a non-drinker a year after completing the film and went into substance-abuse recovery. He said that he and Jack Lemmon were heavy drinkers while making the film. Edwards used the theme of alcohol abuse often in his films, including 10 (1979), Blind Date (1987) and Skin Deep (1989). Both Lemmon and Remick sought help from Alcoholics Anonymous long after they had completed the film. Lemmon revealed to James Lipton on Inside the Actors Studio his past drinking problems and his recovery. The film had a lasting effect in reinforcing the growing social acceptance of Alcoholics Anonymous.

In the interview on Inside the Actors Studio, Lemmon stated that there was pressure by the studio to change the ending. To preserve the integrity of the movie, scenes were filmed in the same order as they appeared in the script, with the last scene filmed last. This is in contrast with the standard practice of filming different scenes together that take place in the same location, which reduces expenses, shortens the schedule, and aids with scheduling the actors' time on set. Immediately following the completion of filming, Lemmon left for Europe and remained out of communication so that the studio would be forced to release the movie without changing the story.

Release
The producers used the following tagline to market the film: "This, in its own terrifying way, is a love story."

The picture opened in the United States on December 26, 1962.

Home media
Warner Home Video released the film on video on February 9, 1983, as part of their "A Night At the Movies" series, featuring a Hearst Metrotone Newsreel; a Warner Bros. animated short; and a coming attractions trailer of films from 1962. A LaserDisc was released in 1990. A DVD of the film was released on January 6, 2001, by Warner Home Video containing an extra commentary track by director Blake Edwards and an interview with Jack Lemmon. A Warner Archive Blu-ray was released on October 29, 2019.

Reception

Critical response
The film became one of Blake Edwards' better-regarded films, opening to praise from the critics and audiences alike. Bosley Crowther, film critic for The New York Times, wrote "[It] is a commanding picture, and it is extremely well played by Mr. Lemmon and Miss Remick, who spare themselves none of the shameful, painful scenes. But for all their brilliant performing and the taut direction of Blake Edwards, they do not bring two pitiful characters to complete and overpowering life."

"Tube." at Variety liked the film, especially the acting and writing: "Miller's gruelling drama illustrates how the unquenchable lure of alcohol can supersede even love, and how marital communication cannot exist in a house divided by one-sided boozing ... Lemmon gives a dynamic and chilling performance. Scenes of his collapse, particularly in the violent ward, are brutally realistic and terrifying. Miss Remick, too, is effective, and there is solid featured work from Charles Bickford and Jack Klugman and a number of fine supporting performances."

In a review of the DVD, critic Gary W. Tooze lauded Edwards' direction: "Blake Edwards's powerful adaptation of J.P. Miller's Playhouse 90 story, starring Jack Lemmon and Lee Remick in career performances, remains a variation in his body of work largely devoted to comedy... Lemmon is at his best and ditto for Remick in this harrowing tale of people consumed by their mutual addiction. This turns to an honest and heartbreaking portrayal of alcoholism as deftly done as any film I can remember."

Margaret Parsons, film curator at the National Gallery of Art, stated "[The film] remains one of the most gut-wrenching dramas of alcohol-related ruin and recovery ever captured on film...and it's also one of the pioneering films of the genre."

On review aggregator Rotten Tomatoes, the film has an approval rating of 100% based on 14 reviews, with an average score of 8.80/10.

Box office
Jack L. Warner claimed the film needed to earn theatrical rentals of 2.5 times its $2 million budget to become profitable. It earned $4 million in rentals in the United States and Canada, from a gross of $8.1 million, ranking it 14th among high-grossing films of the year.

Awards and nominations

Other Honors
 Selected by the film critics of The New York Times as one of the 1000 best films ever made.
 Selected as one of American Film Institute's best 400 films.

Musical Adaptation 
A musical adaptation based on the film and the original teleplay is set to be produced by the Atlantic Theater Company in 2023, starring Kelli O'Hara as Kirsten and Brian d'Arcy James as Joe. The musical has a book by Craig Lucas and music and lyrics by Adam Guettel, the same writing team behind The Light in the Piazza. It is being directed by Michael Greif, with costumes by Dede Ayite, lighting by Ben Stanton, sound by Kai Harada, and orchestrations by the composer. The production is set to start performances at the Linda Gross Theater on May 5, 2023.

"Ain't No Sunshine"
Bill Withers was inspired by Days of Wine and Roses. Withers was watching it on television, and the doomed relationship at the film's center brought to mind a phrase: "Ain’t no sunshine when she’s gone." This led him to write "Ain't No Sunshine" in 1971.

See also

 List of American films of 1962

Notes

References

External links
 
 
 
 
 
 
 
 Days of Wine and Roses at The New York Times 1000 Best Movies Ever Made

1962 films
1962 drama films
American black-and-white films
American drama films
1960s English-language films
Films about alcoholism
Films about marriage
Films based on television plays
Films directed by Blake Edwards
Films scored by Henry Mancini
Films set in San Francisco
Films set in the San Francisco Bay Area
Films shot in San Francisco
Films that won the Best Original Song Academy Award
Warner Bros. films
United States National Film Registry films
1960s American films